Udayar (also spelled Udaiyar, Odayar or Odeyar) is a title or surname found in India.

Indian surnames